The Pilsen Historic District is a historic district located in the Pilsen neighborhood of Chicago. Pilsen is a neighborhood made up of the residential sections of the Lower West Side community area of Chicago. It is recognized as one of the few neighborhoods in Chicago that still has buildings that survived the Great Chicago Fire of 1871. Pilsen was formally founded in 1878 making the neighborhood a factor in the political and economic change planned in Chicago. In the late 19th century Pilsen was inhabited by Czech immigrants who named the district after Pilsen, the fourth largest city in Czechia. The population also included in smaller numbers other ethnic groups from the Austro-Hungarian Empire including Slovaks, Slovenes, Croats and Austrians, as well as immigrants of Polish and Lithuanian heritage. In 1934 majority of  Poles, Croatians, Lithuanians, and Italians sustained Pilsen, making it an ethnic working-class neighborhood.

During the year 1945, the Committee on Minority Groups established a Subcommittee on Social Services for Mexican Migratory Workers due to the increasing migration of Mexican migrant contract workers (braceros). The Czechs had replaced the Germans, who had settled there first with the Irish in the mid-19th century. Although there was a growing Mexican American presence in the late 1950s, it was not until 1962-63 when there was a significant increase in the numbers of Mexican Americans in Pilsen due to the destruction of the neighborhood west of Halsted Street between Roosevelt and Taylor Streets to create room for the construction of the University of Illinois at Chicago. The destruction closed nearby factories where Mexican migrants worked. Other contributing factors to the increasing numbers include the state-sponsored mass labor importation programs in the United States of majority Mexican and Puerto Rican migrants.

Although this area was predominantly Italian American, it was also an important entry point for Mexican immigrants for several decades. Latinos became the majority in 1970 when they surpassed the Slavic population. The neighborhood continued to serve as port of entry for immigrants, both documented and undocumented, mostly from Mexico. In a 2003 case study, Mexican residents remember the early experience of living in early Pilsen. Signs that read ‘No dogs or Mexicans’ were put up all around businesses from the 1950s to 1960s, during the major influx of Mexican immigrants. Other experiences included banks refusing to give mortgages because Pilsen had the largest population of Mexican immigrants.

Since 2000, the Mexican population in Pilsen had decreased. Still, the 2003 case study, addressed that Pilsen was 93% Mexican-American leading to the Chicagoland Chamber of Commerce identifying Pilsen as "an authentically Mexican neighborhood'' and “a true Chicago Barrio''.

On February 1, 2006, Pilsen became a National Historic Register District.

Gentrification 
As early as 1985, Pilsen's proximity to the downtown area and its low-value property became an ideal neighborhood for gentrification. Pilsen residents and community institutions mobilized against two major redevelopments Chicago 21 Plan (the mid-1970s) and Chicago 1992 World's Fair (early to mid-1980s). The neighborhood's long-lasting defense is prompted by its alliance of local developers, Pilsen homeowners, and the city. As of 2014 growing community activists like The Pilsen Alliance, an organization from 1998 that mobilized against the expansion of the University of Illinois at Chicago (UIC) in Pilsen, continued to display an extensive stronghold against developer and city plans.

In 2016 a recent uprise of Pilsen as a neighborhood experiencing gentrification led to the displacement of residents, the shutting down of businesses, and a cultural change in the Historically Mexican neighborhood. According to the Chicago Sun-Times as of 2023 Pilsen community organizations are protesting the increasing property taxes that continue to force residents out of their homes.

See also
National Register of Historic Places listings in West Side Chicago
Czechs in Chicago

References

External links
National Register of Historic Places - Registration Form
Pilsen gets state historical landmark status
Tax freeze preserves Pilsen buildings

Historic districts in Chicago
Lower West Side, Chicago
Czech-American history
Czech communities in the United States
Czech-American culture in Chicago
National Register of Historic Places in Chicago
Ethnic enclaves in Illinois
Historic districts on the National Register of Historic Places in Illinois